Daniel Gorringe (born 2 June 1992) is an Australian media personality and former professional Australian rules footballer who played for  and .

After being drafted from the Norwood Football Club, he made his Australian Football League debut for Gold Coast in 2011 and played 22 games in his five seasons with the Suns, before being delisted and subsequently signed by Carlton, where he played four games in 2016.

Gorringe appeared in Channel 7's Big Brother Australia 2020 reboot where he placed second in the finale. Since then Gorringe has gone on to develop a public profile and has started his podcast career as a host on List Cloggers. He also hosts the podcast 200 PLUS with two other tall blokes. Gorringe has amassed 6.7 million followers on his personal 'TikTok' account. These days, Gorringe goes by the nickname 'the Gorridoor'. Gorringe conceded on a December 2022 List Cloggers episode that he suffered from general shyness when in public.

Early life
Gorringe was born and raised in Adelaide, South Australia where he attended Torrens Valley Christian School throughout his upbringing. He began playing Australian rules football for the Tea Tree Gully Football Club at the age of 13 and later switched to the Norwood Football Club to play top level SANFL football. He played for Norwood's senior side for most of his 2010 season and averaged 21 hit-outs per game for the South Australian state team in the 2010 AFL Under 18 Championships. As a result, he was named as the starting ruckman in the 2010 Under-18 All-Australian team. He was also invited to participate in the 2010 AFL draft combine where he ranked first in physical testing amongst other ruck draft prospects in his age group. A month later,  would draft Gorringe with pick 10 in the 2010 national draft.

AFL career

Gold Coast (2011–2015)
Gorringe made his AFL debut against the Western Bulldogs at Etihad Stadium in round 3, 2011 where he managed a goal and took a spectacular mark that was not awarded by the umpires. Two weeks later he played in Gold Coast's historic first ever AFL win by three points against Port Adelaide at AAMI Stadium. He faced numerous injuries to his ankle and hamstring in 2011 and only managed to play seven games in his first AFL season. His injury problems continued in 2012 when he injured his achilles, which took him out for almost the whole season. In 2013 he managed to play nine AFL games for Gold Coast as a useful ruckman and key forward which earned him a two-year contract extension to the end of 2015.

In 2014 Gorringe suffered another achilles injury which kept him on the sidelines for most of the season. Late in 2014 he recovered to play three AFL games, but a knee injury ended his season prematurely. Gorringe later revealed his decision to give everyone at the Suns "an absolute serve on the way out" when it appeared he had secured a trade to Port Adelaide and had to apologise to the staff at the club when the trade fell through and he returned for their 2015 season. Injuries continued to wreak havoc on his career in 2015 and poor form meant he was only able to play two AFL games. Towards the end of the season his form for Gold Coast's reserves team started to improve and he explored his options to move to another club.

Carlton (2016–2017)
Gorringe got his first opportunity to play an AFL game for  when Carlton's primary ruckman Matthew Kreuzer was injured. He played his first game for Carlton against , matching up against one of the AFL's best ruckmen in Todd Goldstein. He was dominated by Goldstein throughout the match with the hitout discrepancy totalling 38 and Carlton losing the affair by 67 points. He played three more AFL games before a hip injury ended his season. He faced yet another setback in the 2017 pre-season when he re-injured his achilles. At the conclusion of the 2017 season, Gorringe decided to retire from football, having played just 26 games across seven seasons as an AFL player.

Statistics
Statistics are correct to the end of the 2017 season

|- style="background-color: #EAEAEA"
! scope="row" style="text-align:center" | 2011
|style="text-align:center;"|
| 47 || 7 || 2 || 1 || 25 || 34 || 59 || 9 || 6 || 26 || 0.3 || 0.1 || 3.6 || 4.9 || 8.4 || 1.3 || 0.9 || 3.7
|-
! scope="row" style="text-align:center" | 2012
|style="text-align:center;"|
| 47 || 1 || 0 || 0 || 1 || 7 || 8 || 2 || 3 || 1 || 0.0 || 0.0 || 1.0 || 7.0 || 8.0 || 2.0 || 3.0 || 1.0
|- style="background-color: #EAEAEA"
! scope="row" style="text-align:center" | 2013
|style="text-align:center;"|
| 15 || 9 || 3 || 0 || 46 || 60 || 106 || 24 || 13 || 102 || 0.3 || 0.0 || 5.1 || 6.7 || 11.8 || 2.7 || 1.4 || 11.3
|-
! scope="row" style="text-align:center" | 2014
|style="text-align:center;"|
| 15 || 3 || 1 || 1 || 18 || 16 || 34 || 4 || 5 || 54 || 0.3 || 0.3 || 6.0 || 5.3 || 11.3 || 1.3 || 1.7 || 18.0
|- style="background-color: #EAEAEA"
! scope="row" style="text-align:center" | 2015
|style="text-align:center;"|
| 15 || 2 || 1 || 0 || 6 || 11 || 17 || 3 || 7 || 6 || 0.5 || 0.0 || 3.0 || 5.5 || 8.5 || 1.5 || 3.5 || 3.0
|-
! scope="row" style="text-align:center" | 2016
|style="text-align:center;"|
| 37 || 4 || 4 || 3 || 27 || 25 || 52 || 17 || 8 || 36 || 1.0 || 0.8 || 6.8 || 6.3 || 13.0 || 4.3 || 2.0 || 9.0
|- style="background-color: #EAEAEA"
! scope="row" style="text-align:center" | 2017
|style="text-align:center;"|
| 37 || 0 || colspan="16" |
|- class="sortbottom"
! colspan=3| Career
! 26
! 11
! 5
! 123
! 153
! 276
! 59
! 42
! 225
! 0.4
! 0.2
! 4.7
! 5.9
! 10.6
! 2.3
! 1.6
! 8.7
|}

Media career

AFL Memories
In late July 2019, Gorringe began posting a series of humorous memories of his footballing career to social media, gaining a large audience among football fans. The stories included not kicking an open goal as he was instructed not to kick, being verbally sacked in the opening rounds of his final season with Gold Coast and agreeing to no exit meeting and being allowed to "just continue drinking beers", finding out he had been dropped by the AFL app on multiple occasions, retiring before being delisted because "retirement looks better next to my name in the papers and on the internet", abusing Gold Coast staff after believing he was being traded only for no such trade to take place, and faking a hamstring injury to avoid embarrassment after gastro caused him to defecate during a game. The Twitter account gained Gorringe the most attention arguably of his career, with his tweets shared on multiple media outlets, and Gorringe being interviewed on Triple M about his stories. Gorringe received a writing role with Sportsbet after his newfound fame.

Big Brother
Gorringe appeared in Channel 7's Big Brother Australia 2020. He finished the show in second place.

References

External links

1992 births
Living people
Gold Coast Football Club players
Norwood Football Club players
Australian people of English descent
Australian rules footballers from Adelaide
Carlton Football Club players
Preston Football Club (VFA) players
Big Brother (Australian TV series) contestants